Associazione Calcio Palazzolo S.r.l. is an Italian association football club located in Palazzolo sull'Oglio, Lombardy.

It currently plays in Serie D.

History 
It was founded in 1913.

Between 1989 (when it acquired the sports title of G.S. Telgate of Telgate) and 1996 the club played a total of 4 seasons in Serie C1 and 3 in Serie C2.

Colors and badge 
Its colors are skyblue.

External links
Official homepage

Football clubs in Lombardy
Association football clubs established in 1913
Serie C clubs
1913 establishments in Italy